Coon Creek is a stream in Monroe and Randolph counties in the U.S. state of Missouri. It is a tributary of Elk Fork Salt River.

Coon Creek has the name of William Coon, a pioneer settler.

See also
List of rivers of Missouri

References

Rivers of Monroe County, Missouri
Rivers of Randolph County, Missouri
Rivers of Missouri